The 1922 Copa Ibarguren was the 10th. edition of this National cup of Argentina. It was played by the champions of both leagues, Primera División and Liga Rosarina de Football crowned during 1922.

Huracán (Primera División champion) faced Newell's Old Boys (Liga Rosarina champion) in a match held in Estadio Sportivo Barracas on March 4, 1923. As the match ended in a tie, both teams played a new game on April 22 at the same venue, where Huracán defeated Newell's 1–0 taking revenge from the previous edition and therefore winning its first Ibarguren trophy.

Qualified teams 

Note

Match details

Final

Playoff

References

i
i
1922 in Argentine football
1922 in South American football